The Bowling Green Falcons baseball team is a varsity athletic program at Bowling Green State University in Bowling Green, Ohio, The team plays in the National Collegiate Athletic Association (NCAA) at the Division I level as a member of the Mid-American Conference. The program has 12 regular-season conference championships (7 NWOIAA, 5 MAC), six East Division championships, and three conference tournament championships. The most recent regular-season championship came in 2009. The 1921 team was the first athletic team at the school to win a title, when they finished 6–1–2 in the Northwest Ohio League.

History

Early years
The first baseball team at Bowling Green Normal College was established in 1915 under the guide of head coach F.G. Beyerman and finished their inaugural campaign at 1–3.  The program would not reach varsity level until 1918, playing their first game on May 3, 1918 defeating Defiance College 4–3 in 7 innings.  The Normals would finish the 1918 season 2–1 defeating Bluffton College 6–5 and losing a rematch with Defiance 13–3.

Bowling Green joined the Northwest Ohio League in 1921 and finished the season 6–1–2, good enough to make the Normals NWOIAA champions in their first year in the conference.  The 1921 Normals baseball team would be the first athletic program at Bowling Green to win a title of any sort.

In May 1944 the baseball team won 1–0 against the Camp Perry team, where Italian prisoners of war watched the game.

Bowling Green would win six more NWOIAA titles (1922, 1925–26, 1928, 1931–32), before deciding to leave the conference and become an independent.

Move to the MAC
In 1953, Bowling Green would become a member of the Mid-American Conference, following rival and former NWOIAA conference mate Toledo who joined in 1951.  In their first season in the MAC, the Falcons would go 8–6 including a 4–4 conference record which would place them 3rd in the conference.  Bowling Green would not win their first MAC crown until 1972 when they posted a 24–12–2 record (6–2–1 MAC) and were invited to the NCAA District IV Tournament.  The Falcons would defeat Northern Illinois 2–0 and Central Michigan 7–5 in 10 innings, but fell just short of a birth to the College World Series as they lost 7–2 and 7–5 to Iowa.

Since moving to the MAC, Bowling Green has won six more regular season championships (1995, 1998–99, 2001–02, 2008) and two conference tournament championships (1998–99).  The Falcons were the MAC's representative in the 1999 NCAA Division I baseball tournament and were selected to compete as the 4th seed in the Columbus Regional, hosted by Ohio State.  The Falcons would go 0–2, losing to 1st seed Ohio State 4–1 and then lost in the loser's bracket 10–5 to the 2nd seed Nebraska.

Danny Schmitz era
Danny Schmitz replaced Ed Platzer as head coach of the Bowling Green Falcons in 1991. In Schmitz's first season as head coach, the Falcons posted a 16–39–1 (7–23) record and finished 9th in the MAC. Schmitz would turn the program around in his fourth season (1994) posting a 29–18 (16–10) record, finishing 3rd in the MAC. He would lead the Falcons to their second MAC crown the following year posting a 34–20 (22–8) record.

Under Schmitz' watch, the Falcons have won five regular-season conference championships, six East Division titles, two conference tournament championships, and an NCAA Tournament appearance. Schmitz is second longest tenured coach in the program's history, only behind Warren E. Steller (31 seasons) and is the programs all-time winningest manager with 489 wins. Schmitz became the program's all-time winningest coach on March 26, 2000 after the Falcons defeated Buffalo 3–2.
 
After 105 years, the sport was dropped at the varsity level effective immediately on May 15, 2020 as part of the budget cuts due to the on-going coronavirus pandemic. Just weeks later, the school announced it was reinstating baseball after they fund-raised $1.5 million dollars of commitments over the next three years. On June 3, 2020, it was announced that Schmitz would step down from head coach and step into an advisory role with the program.

Steller Field

Steller Field has been home to the Falcons baseball team since 1964.  The field is named in honor of Warren E. Steller, a former instructor at the school who coached the school's football (1924–34) and baseball (1925, 1928–59) teams.  The stadium is located on the Bowling Green campus, next to Slater Family Ice Arena and across the street from the Perry Field House.

Year-by-year results
For the year-by-year history of Bowling Green baseball see List of Bowling Green Falcons baseball seasonsHead coaches

1 – Records for 1916 and 1917 are unknown2 – Bowling Green did not field teams in 1935 and 1937 due to lack of funds and a playing site''

Notable alumni
 Burke Badenhop – pitcher.
 Doug Bair – retired pitcher, 2-time World Series champion.
 Orel Hershiser – retired pitcher, member of 1988 World Series Champion Los Angeles Dodgers, 3-time All-Star, 1988 Cy Young Award winner and 1988 World Series MVP.
 Roger McDowell – retired pitcher, member of 1986 World Champion New York Mets.
 Nolan Reimold – outfielder.
 Andy Tracy – retired first baseman.
 Dan Szalay – second baseman.

References

External links
Official site of Bowling Green Falcons baseball

 
Baseball teams established in 1915
1915 establishments in Ohio